The Recife Open Internacional de Tenis is a tennis tournament held in Recife, Brazil since 2011. The event is part of the ATP Challenger Tour and is played on outdoor hard courts.

Past finals

Singles

Doubles

References

External links

ATP Challenger Tour
Tennis tournaments in Brazil
Hard court tennis tournaments